William Rhoads (born 8 June 1995) is an American ski jumper.

Career 
He made his World Cup debut 2015 season in Kuopio with 42nd place. He represented US at the FIS Nordic World Ski Championships 2015 in Falun where he was disqualified on normal hill individual event.

World Cup

Standings

Individual starts (19)

References

External links 
 

1995 births
Living people
American male ski jumpers
Ski jumpers at the 2012 Winter Youth Olympics
Olympic ski jumpers of the United States
Ski jumpers at the 2018 Winter Olympics
People from Park City, Utah